Frederick Augustus Conrad Muhlenberg (January 1, 1750 – June 4, 1801) was an American minister and politician who was the first Speaker of the United States House of Representatives and the first Dean of the United States House of Representatives. A member of the Federalist Party, he was delegate to the Pennsylvania state constitutional convention and a member of the U.S. House of Representatives from Pennsylvania and a Lutheran pastor by profession, Muhlenberg was born in Trappe, Pennsylvania. His home, known as The Speaker's House, is now a museum and is currently undergoing restoration to restore its appearance during Muhlenberg's occupancy.

Early life and ministerial career
Frederick Muhlenberg was born in Trappe, Pennsylvania, the son of Anna Maria (Weiser) and Heinrich Melchior Mühlenberg. His father, an immigrant from Germany, was considered the founder of the Lutheran Church in North America. His maternal grandfather was Pennsylvania German colonial leader Conrad Weiser. His brother, Peter, was a general in the Continental Army and his brother Gotthilf Heinrich Ernst was a botanist.

In 1763, together with his brothers John Peter Gabriel and Gotthilf Henry Ernst, he attended the Latina at the Franckesche Stiftungen in Halle, Germany. In 1769, he attended the University of Halle, where he studied theology. He was ordained by the Pennsylvania Ministerium as a minister of the Lutheran Church on October 25, 1770. He preached in Stouchsburg, Pennsylvania, and Lebanon, Pennsylvania, from 1770 to 1774, and in New York City from 1774 to 1776. When the British entered New York at the onset of the American Revolutionary War, he felt obliged to leave and returned to Trappe. He moved to New Hanover Township, Pennsylvania and was pastor there and in Oley and New Goshenhoppen until August 1779.

On October 15, 1771, he married Catherine Schaeffer, the daughter of wealthy Philadelphia sugar refiner David Schaeffer. They had seven children.

Political career

Continental Congress 
Muhlenberg was a member of the Continental Congress in 1779 and 1780, and served in the Pennsylvania House of Representatives from 1780 to 1783. He was elected its speaker on November 3, 1780. He was a delegate to and chairman of the Pennsylvania state constitutional convention in 1787 called to ratify the Federal Constitution. He was the first signer of the Bill of Rights.

U.S. House of Representatives 
He served as a member of the U.S. House of Representatives from Pennsylvania in the first and the three succeeding United States Congresses (March 4, 1789 – March 4, 1797). Muhlenberg was also the first Speaker of the United States House of Representatives. In August 1789, he cast the deciding vote for the location of the nation's new capital. He did not seek renomination as speaker in 1796. On April 29, 1796, as chairman of the Committee of the Whole, he cast the deciding vote for the laws necessary to carry out the Jay Treaty.

In 1794, during Muhlenberg's second tenure as Speaker, the House voted 42–41 against a proposal to translate some of the laws into German. Muhlenberg, who himself abstained from the vote, commented later that "the faster the Germans become Americans, the better it will be." Despite not having voted against the bill, a legend, the Muhlenberg Legend, developed in which he was responsible for prohibiting German as an official language of the United States.

According to another legend, Muhlenberg also suggested that the title of the President of the United States should be "Mr. President," instead of "His High Mightiness" or "His Elected Majesty," as John Adams had suggested.

Other offices 

Muhlenberg was president of the council of censors of Pennsylvania, and was appointed receiver general of the Pennsylvania Land Office on January 8, 1800, serving until his death in Lancaster, Pennsylvania, on June 4, 1801.

Death and legacy 
He was interred in Woodward Hill Cemetery in Lancaster.

See also
 German language in the United States
 The Speaker's House, in Trappe, Pennsylvania, home of Frederick Muhlenberg
 Muhlenberg College, in Allentown, Pennsylvania, named for Henry Muhlenberg

References

Biography and portrait at the University of Pennsylvania

Notes

External links

 

1750 births
1801 deaths
People from Trappe, Pennsylvania
People of colonial Pennsylvania
Muhlenberg family
Pennsylvania Dutch people
Lutherans from Pennsylvania
Continental Congressmen from Pennsylvania
Speakers of the United States House of Representatives
Pro-Administration Party members of the United States House of Representatives from Pennsylvania
Anti-Administration Party members of the United States House of Representatives from Pennsylvania
Democratic-Republican Party members of the United States House of Representatives from Pennsylvania
Deans of the United States House of Representatives
Speakers of the Pennsylvania House of Representatives
Members of the Pennsylvania House of Representatives
Politicians from Lancaster, Pennsylvania
18th-century American Lutheran clergy
18th-century Lutheran theologians
19th-century Lutheran theologians
University of Halle alumni
Burials in Pennsylvania
Burials at Woodward Hill Cemetery